Bass Point is a headland on the coast of Cornwall, England, UK. It is at the southern tip of the Lizard peninsula, in the civil parish of Landewednack. The headland was a communications centre, during the Victorian era with the Lloyds Signal Station, opened in 1872 for shore to ship communications and Marconi's experiments with wireless at the Lizard Wireless Station.

Geography
Between the two headlands is the Lizard Lighthouse and Housel Cove and less than a mile to the north is Church Cove. Bass Point can be reached by following the A3083 from Helston to the end of the road at Lizard village and than walking the final mile along Lloyds Road to the coast. The South-west coastal footpath crosses the headland which is part of the Cornwall Area of Outstanding Natural Beauty.

History

Before the advent of the telegraph ships had no means of communication with their owners and could only send messages by semaphore, when they were close to the shore. The telegraph reached Falmouth in 1857 and G. C. Fox & Company built a signal station at Bass Point with the intention of laying a telegraph cable from Falmouth. The Post Office intervened and the Lloyds Signal Station was opened on 1 April 1872. Initially communications between ship and shore were by flags and the messages were then sent to Helston by post or by horse rider. On 2 June 1872 a cable reached the signal station and the Post Office opened an office at the station. Night signals by coloured lights, gun, rocket and steam whistles began in November 1872 and William Broad & Sons, also of Falmouth opened an office next door. The companies combined their operations in 1875 and by 1877 over one hundred vessels a month were using the station. It has been restored to recreate the original radio room and may be visited.

Marconi constructed two wireless stations on the Lizard; the main, larger station being at Poldhu on the west coast. In 1900 he made the first ever ′over the horizon′ radio signal to the Isle of Wight.

The former HM Coastguard station at Bass Point was the first location refurbished by the voluntary National Coastwatch Institution, in 1994, following the deaths of two local fishermen close to the point.

Natural history
Bass Point is part of the Caerthillian to Kennack Site of Special Scientific Interest (SSSI) and since August 2016 is included within The Lizard National Nature Reserve (NNR). In recent years the National Trust has removed Hottentot fig (Carpobrotus edulis), an introduced plant, which forms mats covering the coastal grassland.

References

Headlands of Cornwall
History of radio
Industrial archaeological sites in Cornwall
Lizard Peninsula
National Trust properties in Cornwall